The 2015 Gooik–Geraardsbergen–Gooik was a one-day women's cycle race held in Belgium, starting and finishing in Gooik, on 31 May 2015. The race had a UCI rating of 1.1. The race was won by Australia's Gracie Elvin.

Results

See also
 2015 in women's road cycling

References

Gooik-Geraardsbergen-Gooik
Gooik-Geraardsbergen-Gooik
Gooik-Geraardsbergen-Gooik